has its roots in Kyushu Jo-Gakuin (九州女学院), originally established as a girl's high school in 1926. A women's junior college opened in 1975 and the current four-year, liberal arts college opened its doors to women and men in 1997. The Rev. Dr. Yoshiro Ishida was the college's first president. The Rev. Naohiro Kiyoshige served as college president frpom 2002. In 2016, after President Kiyoshige's retirement, Hirowatari Junko became the next president. In addition to a liberal arts curriculum, preparation for teacher certification is also offered.

Kyushu Lutheran College is one of two colleges affiliated with the Japan Evangelical Lutheran Church.

Studying at Kyushu Lutheran College
Humanities
Career English 
Children’s Studies

Clinical Psychology
Psychology
Disabilities Studies
Psychological Welfare

Lutheran universities and colleges
Christian universities and colleges in Japan
Private universities and colleges in Japan
Buildings and structures in Kumamoto
Universities and colleges in Kumamoto Prefecture